Jack "Spot" Comer (12 April 1912 – 12 March 1996) was a Polish-born English gangster who rose to rule London's underworld.

Early life and rise to the top of London's underworld.

He was born Jacob Colmore in Mile End, London, the youngest of four children. Comer's father was a Jewish tailor's machinist who, to escape anti-Semitic pogroms, had emigrated to London with his wife from Łódź, Poland, around 1900. It was a bad time for Jewish immigrants and refugees who arrived in the Britain during this period. Anti-Semitism was both in the streets and the corridors of power. This antagonistic environment was, in part, organised by British Brother's League. To assimilate more into English society, the family changed their name from Comacho to Colmore, and later to Comer. His mother's maiden name was Lifschinska.

Comer grew up in a Jewish ghetto street in Fieldgate Mansions, Whitechapel, along the west side of Myrdle Street, across from the Irish in terraced houses along the east side. At the age of seven, Comer joined his first gang, which was made up of boys from the Jewish side of Myrdle Street who fought their Catholic rivals from the other end of the street. Proving his abilities as a street fighter, Comer soon joined Alfred Solomon's gang, The Yiddishers, and saw a route out of poverty. As was custom to gangs, Comer got a nickname. He was called "Spot" because he was always "on the spot" when there was trouble, although others claim it was because of a mole on his left cheek.

In pre-Second World War Britain, anti-Semitism and fascism was a feature of everyday lives for Jews. Comer gained a reputation amongst Jews as a someone to call for protection. Sometimes paid and  other times for the principle, he often found himself in violent encounters with anti-Semites. He was involved in the Battle of Cable Street and other attacks on Oswald Mosely's Blackshirts.  In the post-war era, Comer is said to have been involved in funding the 43 Group, a group of Jewish ex-servicemen and women who took direct action to violently oppose and disrupt the actions of the fascist Union Movement and other far-right and extreme-right groups.

Rapidly becoming a powerful force in the East End, and having built a reputation running "muscle" in Leeds, Birmingham and other northern nightclubs, Comer and his gang began to violently take control of racecourses across Britain. After wrestling the courses from many of gangs across the country, the money from racecourses abruptly ceased as they closed with the outbreak of war.    After being conscripted into the Army, from which he was discharged for beating an anti-Semitic superior officer, Comer returned to London to expand his control. Spreading his influence outside of the East End into the West End, Comer made huge profits from running drinking clubs and gaming rooms, as well as taking "protection" money from businesses across the capital. Although his rise to the top was violent, Comer's real skill was bringing together criminals of different capabilities for "jobs". Muscle, burglars, safe crackers, forgers, fences, hi-jackers and thieves were brought together to suit the job at hand. On top of this, there were MP's and police on his payroll and, at his strongest, up to a thousand men on call to face any threat to his empire.  It was organised crime in a way that had not been seen in London before. It was under Comer's leadership that criminals such as Billy Hill, the  Kray twins and Freddie Forman were able to rise in London's underworld.

Decline and later years
From the mid 1950s, after over a decade at the top of London's underworld, Comer's control of the East and West End was challenged. Billy Hill was a talented and smart thief who had written to Comer asking to work for him whilst Hill was serving time. Comer took a shine to Hill and on his release from prison Hill was picked up, taken to Saville Row for a suit and then on to meet Comer. Recognising Hill's talent for crime, Comer took him under his wing and gave Hill a few spielers to run. Eventually, when Hill had amassed enough money and clout he made his move against his mentor.

Trouble with the law and a systematic attack on his sources of income by Hill and others led to Comer being squeezed out. In 1954, after publishing derogatory articles at the behest of Billy Hill, Comer attacked Sunday People crime journalist Duncan Webb and was fined £50. He was accused of possession of a knuckle-duster and convicted of grievous bodily harm. Although a small fine for Comer, the court case took over a lot of his time. Similarly, in 1955 he was arrested following a knife fight with Albert Dimes. Dimes had refused to pay protection money to Comer, who confronted him in Frith Street, Soho. Dimes fled but was cornered by Comer in a green grocer. After Comer was cleared of the stabbing charge, he said it was because of "the greatest lawyer in history", his barrister Rose Heilbron.

In 1956, Comer and his wife were ambushed and viciously attacked by a group of eight men armed with clubs and knives about 100 yards outside their Paddington flat. Two of the attackers, "Mad" Frankie Fraser and Bobby Warren, were each sentenced to seven years in prison. 
Whilst recovering from his injuries, Comer's enemies "grassed" him up to the police for attacking and cutting a petty criminal, Tommy Falco. In all probability, the wound was most likely inflicted by Falco himself or others to frame Comer. The result was that, while Comer was imprisoned awaiting trial, Billy Hill was able to take over Comers' West End interests. Comer decided to retire from organized crime. 

During the next few decades, the former "King of the Underworld" would often be seen at boxing matches and undertook various jobs over the years, including being an antique furniture dealer. He  died in Isleworth at 83; his ashes were spread in Israel.

In popular culture
Comer is a major character in the 2019 film Once Upon A Time In London.

Comer is mentioned in the song "Ghosts of Cable Street" by The Men They Couldn't Hang, where he is referred to as "Jack Spot".

References

Further reading
Morton, James. Gangland Bosses: The Lives of Jack Spot and Billy Hill. London, 2004.
Clarkson, Wensley. Hit 'Em Hard Jack Spot, King of the Underworld. HarperCollins Publishers 

1912 births
1996 deaths
English gangsters
English anti-fascists
English Jews
English people of Polish-Jewish descent
Organised crime in London
Criminals from London
People from Mile End
Jewish anti-fascists